Umm Ḥakīm Al-Bayḍāʾ bint ʿAbd al-Muṭṭalib was an aunt of Muhammad.

She was born in Mecca around 546, the daughter of Abd al-Muttalib and Fatima bint Amr al-Makhzumiya. She was the twin sister of Abdullah, the father of Muhammad. Umm Hakim was known as Al-Bayḍāʾ ("the White One") because she was Abd al-Muttalib's only fair-skinned daughter.

She married Kurayz ibn Rabi'a from the Abd Shams clan of the Quraysh. Their children were Amir, Arwa (the mother of the future Caliph Uthman), Talha and Umm Talha.

Umm Hakim died before 610.

References

Family of Muhammad
540s births
Year of birth uncertain
Year of death unknown
Banu Hashim
6th-century Arabs